The Bro Code: How Contemporary Culture Creates Sexist Men is a 2011 documentary film created by Thomas Keith. The film has been described as a treatise on misogyny.

See also 
 Exploitation of women in mass media
 Gender studies
 Misandry
 Misanthropy
 Misogyny in rap music
 Gender in horror films
 Misogyny and mass media
 Misogyny in sports
 Sexism

References

External links

Sexism
2011 films
Documentary films about misogyny
2011 documentary films
American documentary films
2010s English-language films
2010s American films